The 2015–16 season is the 119th season of competitive football by Heart of Midlothian. It is the club's first season of play back in the top tier of Scottish football since 2014, having been promoted from the Scottish Championship at the end of the previous season, having played just one season in the Scottish Championship. The club had been relegated from the Premiership at the end of the 2013–14 season. In the League Cup, Hearts reached the quarter-final and were eliminated by Celtic. Hearts will also compete in the Scottish Cup.

Friendlies
Hearts returned for pre-season training on 19 June, before heading to Ireland for a four-day training camp in Dublin, with games against Bohemian and Shelbourne. On return to Scotland the club travelled to Raith Rovers, Dumbarton, Stirling Albion and Cowdenbeath. Hearts also took part in the Oban Challenge Cup, winning the Round-robin format tournament. The squad then traveled to England to play Preston North End, before returning to Edinburgh to play English Premier League side Everton.

Fixtures

Scottish Premiership

The fixture list for the first 33 Scottish Premiership matches in the 2015–16 season were announced on 19 June. Hearts were handed a home game to start the season against St Johnstone, with the championship flag set to be unveiled, having been promoted as champions the previous season. The match had been scheduled to be played on 1 August, however was moved to 2 August to be shown on live television.

Fixtures

League Cup

Having played in the Scottish Championship during the previous season, Hearts entered the League Cup at the first round stage. The draw was held on 6 July 2015, and the club were drawn at home against Scottish League Two side Arbroath.

Fixtures

Scottish Cup

Having played in the Scottish Championship during the previous season, Hearts entered the Scottish Cup at the fourth round stage. The draw was held on 1 December 2015, and the club were drawn at home against fellow Scottish Premiership side Aberdeen.

Fixtures

First team player statistics

Captains

Squad information
The table below includes all players registered with the SPFL as part of Hearts squad for 2015–16 season. They may not have made an appearance.
Last updated 10 February 2016

Disciplinary record
During the 2015–16 season, Hearts players have been issued with fifty-five yellow cards and four reds. The table below shows the number of cards and type shown to each player. The red card issued to Callum Paterson during the game versus Hamilton Academical on 29 August, for a foul on Darian MacKinnon was reduced on appeal to a yellow card and as such is listed as a yellow card.

Having gone over the SFA disciplinary points threshold, Callum Paterson, Juanma Delgado and Błażej Augustyn served a one-match ban.
Last updated 10 February 2016

Top scorers
Last updated on 15 May 2016

Clean sheets
{| class="wikitable" style="font-size: 95%; text-align: center;"
|-
! style="background:maroon; color:white;" scope="col" width=60|
! style="background:maroon; color:white;" scope="col" width=60|
! style="background:maroon; color:white;" scope="col" width=60|
! style="background:maroon; color:white;" scope="col" width=150|Name
! style="background:maroon; color:white;" scope="col" width=80|Premiership
! style="background:maroon; color:white;" scope="col" width=80|League Cup
! style="background:maroon; color:white;" scope="col" width=80|Scottish Cup
! style="background:maroon; color:white;" scope="col" width=80|Total
|-
|1
|GK
|
|Neil Alexander
|16
|0
|1
|17
|-
|2
|GK
|
|Jack Hamilton
|1
|0
|0
|1
|-
|
|
|
! Totals !! 17 !! 0 !! 1 !! 18

Team statistics

League table

Division summary

Management statistics
Last updated on 15 May 2016

Home attendances

{| class="wikitable sortable" style="text-align:center; font-size:90%"
|-
! style="background:maroon; color:white;" scope="col" width=100 | Comp
! style="background:maroon; color:white;" scope="col" width=120 | Date
! style="background:maroon; color:white;" scope="col" width=60 | Score
! style="background:maroon; color:white;" scope="col" width=250 class="unsortable" | Opponent
! style="background:maroon; color:white;" scope="col" width=150 | Attendance
|-
|League Cup||30 July 2015||bgcolor="#CCFFCC"|4–2 ||Arbroath||6,240
|-
|Premiership||2 August 2015||bgcolor="#CCFFCC"|4–3||St Johnstone||16,334
|-
|Premiership||12 August 2015||bgcolor="#CCFFCC"|2–0||Motherwell||16,645
|-
|Premiership||22 August 2015||bgcolor="#CCFFCC"|3–0||Partick Thistle||16,657
|-
|Premiership||20 September 2015||bgcolor="#FFCCCC"|1–3||Aberdeen||16,702
|-
|Premiership||3 October 2015||bgcolor="#FFFFCC"|1–1||Kilmarnock||16,461
|-
|Premiership||24 October 2015||bgcolor="#CCFFCC"|2–0||Ross County||16,264
|-
|League Cup||28 October 2015||bgcolor="#FFCCCC"|1–2||Celtic||11,598
|-
|Premiership||7 November 2015||bgcolor="#CCFFCC"|2–0||Hamilton Academical||16,121
|-
|Premiership||21 November 2015||bgcolor="#FFFFCC"|1–1||Dundee||16,736
|-
|Premiership||27 December 2015||bgcolor="#FFFFCC"|2–2||Celtic||16,844
|-
|Premiership||30 December 2015||bgcolor="#CCFFCC"|3–2||Dundee United||16,721
|-
|Scottish Cup||9 January 2016||bgcolor="#CCFFCC"|1–0||Aberdeen||13,595
|-
|Premiership||16 January 2016||bgcolor="#CCFFCC"|6–0||Motherwell||16,574
|-
|Scottish Cup||7 February 2016||bgcolor="#FFFFCC"|2–2||Hibernian||16,845
|-
|Premiership||27 February 2016||bgcolor="#CCFFCC"|1–0||Kilmarnock||16,354
|-
|Premiership||1 March 2016||bgcolor="#CCFFCC"|2–0||Inverness Caledonian Thistle||15,767
|-
|Premiership||5 March 2016||bgcolor="#CCFFCC"|1–0||Partick Thistle||16,558
|-
|Premiership||19 March 2016||bgcolor="#FFCCCC"|0–3||St Johnstone||16,295
|-
|Premiership||8 April 2016||bgcolor="#CCFFCC"|2–1||Aberdeen||16,995
|-
|Premiership||30 April 2016||bgcolor="#FFCCCC"|1–3||Celtic||16,527
|-
|Premiership||7 May 2016||bgcolor="#FFFFCC"|1–1||Ross County||15,438
|-
|Premiership||15 May 2016||bgcolor="#FFFFCC"|2–2||St Johnstone||16,046
|-
|bgcolor="#C0C0C0"|
|bgcolor="#C0C0C0"|
|bgcolor="#C0C0C0"|
| Total attendance:
|360,317
|-
|bgcolor="#C0C0C0"|
|bgcolor="#C0C0C0"|
|bgcolor="#C0C0C0"|
| Total league attendance:
|312,039
|-
|bgcolor="#C0C0C0"|
|bgcolor="#C0C0C0"|
|bgcolor="#C0C0C0"|
| Average league attendance:
|16,423

Club

Club staff

Boardroom

|-

Playing kit
Hearts kits were manufactured by Puma for the 2015–16 season, ending the club's three-year association with Adidas. The home and away kits are sponsored by the charity Save the Children, in a three-year deal funded through philanthropy. The sponsorship deal marked the first time a UK based football club had been sponsored by a worldwide charity.

Deaths
The following players and people associated with the club died over the course of the season. Former forward Jimmy Murray.

Transfers

Players in

Players out

Loans and temporary transfers In

Loans and temporary transfers out

Contract extensions
The following players extended their contracts with the club over the course of the season.

See also
List of Heart of Midlothian F.C. seasons

Notes

References

Heart of Midlothian F.C. seasons
Heart of Midlothian